Yang Hae-Joon (Hangul: 양해준; born 4 October 1990) is a South Korean football player.

Club Statistics

References

External links

1990 births
Living people
Association football midfielders
South Korean footballers
South Korean expatriate footballers
J2 League players
Kataller Toyama players
Expatriate footballers in Japan
South Korean expatriate sportspeople in Japan